The 2022 Tailteann Cup Final was the inaugural final of the Tailteann Cup and the culmination of the 2022 Tailteann Cup. The match was played at Croke Park in Dublin on 9 July 2022, between Cavan and Westmeath. Westmeath won the match on a scoreline of 2–14 to 1–13.

The game was televised nationally on RTÉ2 as part of The Saturday Game live programme, presented by Joanne Cantwell from the outdoor COVID-19 pandemic-proofed studio at Croke Park, with analysis from Enda McGinley, Pat Spillane and Lee Keegan. Match commentary was provided by Ger Canning and Kevin McStay.

John Heslin overtook Dessie Dolan as Westmeath's all-time championship top scorer in this game.

Paths to the final

Cavan

Westmeath

Pre-match

Scoring
Ahead of the game, the top scorer for Cavan in the 2022 Ulster SFC and Tailteann Cup was Gearóid McKiernan, while the top scorer for Westmeath in the 2022 Leinster SFC and Tailteann Cup was John Heslin.

Officials
Derry's Barry Cassidy was the referee for the final. Maurice Deegan of Laois had originally been listed to referee the final of the inaugural competition, but the GAA confirmed a change of referee on 6 July. Deegan was absent for what would have been his final inter-county game after contracting COVID-19.

Match

Team news
Both teams made one change from the match programme before the game – Niall Carolan replaced Martin Reilly for Cavan, while Sam Duncan replaced Nigel Harte on the Westmeath side.

Summary
Westmeath became the inaugural winners of the Tailteann Cup, scoring 1–4 without reply in the final 13 minutes to take the trophy.

A red card for Cavan's Thomas Galligan in the 58th minute was the turning point of the game. Cavan were leading by two, 1–13 to 1–11, when Galligan caught Westmeath's Ronan O'Toole with a high frontal shoulder. O'Toole went on to be the man-of-the-match.

Details

Aftermath
Thousands of people came out to celebrate in Mullingar after Westmeath's victory over Cavan in the final.

The losing Cavan players received their medals at the Hotel Kilmore on 30 October 2022, alongside their Ulster runners-up medals from 2020.

The winning Westmeath players received their medals at the Mullingar Park Hotel on 2 December 2022, alongside medals given to the winners of the 2008 National Football League Division 2 title (they had not received them for 14 years) and the hurlers who won the 2021 Joe McDonagh Cup.

References

2022 in Gaelic football
Cavan county football team matches
Westmeath county football team matches
Tailteann Cup
Tailteann Cup